UAAP Season 53 is the 1990–91 athletic year of the University Athletic Association of the Philippines.

Men's basketball
The UAAP men's basketball competition opens on July 28 at the Ninoy Aquino Stadium after the opening ceremonies were twice postponed.

Team standings

Defending seniors champion De La Salle University swept the first round of eliminations with seven straight victories. The Green Archers, however, saw their first three victories being reversed to a loss, when the UAAP board, via a 5–1 vote, ruled that Green Archer Noli Locsin had not completed the required one-year residency in La Salle and its therefore ineligible to play this season. Locsin saw action in their games against the Bulldogs, the Falcons and Glowing Goldies. La Salle fell to four wins and three losses, the UST Glowing Goldies, who were beaten by the Green Archers, 80–90, assumed the leadership with a 7–0 win–loss card. National University, who were routed by De La Salle, 61–91, on opening day last July 28, finally broke into a win column. The Green Archers did preserved their 64–57 conquest of arch rivals Ateneo Blue Eagles. 

UST Glowing Goldies raced to an 8–0 win–loss record, following their 101–89 win over NU Bulldogs at the start of the second round. The UP Maroons handed the Goldies their first loss with a 75–66 victory on September 8.

After the two-round eliminations, De La Salle took the first finals seat with an 11–3 win–loss card. The UE Warriors and Ateneo Blue Eagles dispute the second finals berth on October 4 at the Araneta Coliseum. The Eagles of Ateneo coach Chot Reyes failed to make it another classic Ateneo-La Salle encounter following the Eagles' hairline 78–80 setback to the Warriors. The UST Glowing Goldies, after eight wins in a row, lost their last six matches with Edward Joseph Feihl sitting out and missed majority of UST's game in the second round as he was sidelined with an infection.

La Salle need to only win once to retain the title, the UE Warriors, who lost to the Green Archers twice in the eliminations, 91–93 in overtime and 74–76, had to win twice in order to capture the UAAP crown.

Juniors basketball

Team standings

Adamson Baby Falcons outclassed Ateneo Blue Eaglets, 79-67, on the final day of the eliminations on September 29 at the Loyola Center to finish with a 13-win, 1-loss record. The Baby Falcons advanced to the playoffs with a twice-to-beat advantage over the second-seeded Eaglets, needing to beat Ateneo only once to clinch their third straight title.

Championships summary

Seniors Division championships

Juniors Division championships

Overall Championship race

Juniors' Division

Seniors' Division

See also
NCAA Season 66 basketball tournaments

References

1990 in Philippine basketball
53